This is an alphabetical list of major titles produced by Coronet Films, a leading educational film company from the 1940s through 1990s (when it merged with Phoenix Learning Group, Inc.). The majority of these films were initially available in the 16mm film format. The company started offering VHS videocassette versions in 1979 in addition to films, before making the transition to strictly videos around 1986.

For space reasons, only a very select number of independently produced films that Coronet merely distributed, including many TV and British productions acquired for 16mm release within the United States, are included here. One example is a popular series, "World Cultures & Youth", which was actually produced in Canada, but with some backing by Coronet. Also included are those Centron Corporation titles released when Coronet owned them, although their back catalogue of films made earlier were reissued under the Coronet banner.

It was quite common for a film to be re-released as a "2nd edition" with only minor changes in the edit and a different soundtrack, with music and narration styles changed to fit the changing times. This was especially true in the 1970s, when classrooms demanded more stimulating cinematic lectures. Quite often, only the newest edition of a film is available today. Those titles involving more serious edit changes or actual re-filming are listed as separate titles. In most cases, additional information is provided in the "year / copyright date" column.

A

B

C

D

E

F

G
{| class="wikitable sortable" border="1"
|-
!Title!!Major credits (mostly advisers prior to '70s)!!Black & white or color (& running time)!!Year / copyright date!!Notes
|-
|-
|The Galapagos: Darwin's Clues || Robert I. Bowman || c-13m ||  July 16, 1973 || 
|-
|Galileo ||  || c-13m ||  September 3, 1959 || 
|-
|Garden Plants and How They Grow || John Smart (producer); Helen J. Challand || c-11m ||  December 10, 1953 || Exploring Science
|-
|Genetic Biology || Bruce Wallace|| c-16m || 1982 || Biological Sciences
|-
|Genetics: Chromosomes and Genes (Meiosis)  || William K. Baker || c-16m ||  May 1, 1968 || 
|-
|Genetics: Functions of DNA and RNA  || William K. Baker || c-13m ||  May 7, 1968  || 
|-
|Genetics: Human Heredity  || William K. Baker || c-14m ||  May 1, 1968  || 
|-
|Genetics: Improving Plants and Animals  || William K. Baker || c-14m ||  February 1, 1962  || 
|-
|Genetics: Mendel's Laws  || William K. Baker || c-14m ||  May 1, 1962  || 
|-
|Geography of Alaska and Hawaii || Thomas Frank Barton || c-16m ||  February 2, 1970 || 
|-
|Geography of the Middle Atlantic States || John Smart (producer); Thomas F. Barton || c-11m ||  June 15, 1953 || 
|-
|Geography of New England || David A. Smart (producer); Thomas Frank Barton || c-11m ||  February 19, 1951 || 
|-
|Geography of the North Central States  || John H. Garland || c-10m ||  February 22, 1956 || 
|-
|Geography of the Pacific States (Living in the Pacific States) || John H. Garland || c-10m ||  March 16, 1956, revised 2nd version 1971 || 
|-
|Geography of the Rocky Mountain States || David A. Smart (producer); Earl B. Shaw || bw-11m ||  April 3, 1952 || 
|-
|Geography of South America  || William J. Ketter || c-11m ||  September 26, 1977 || 
|-
|Geography of South America: Argentina & Uruguay  || William J. Ketteringham || c-11m ||  February 1, 1961, revised 2nd version 1977 || 
|-
|Geography of South America: Brazil || Reynold E. Carlson || c-14m ||  March 21, 1961, revised 2nd version 1977 || 
|-
|Geography of South America: The Continent || Reynold E. Carlson || c-15m ||  May 3, 1961 || 
|-
|Geography of South America: Countries of the Andes || Frank Leuer Keller || c-11m ||  March 21, 1961, revised 2nd version 1977 || 
|-
|Geography of South America: Five Northern Countries  || Donald D. Brand || c-11m ||  April 1, 1959, revised 2nd version 1977 || 
|-
|Geography of the Southern States || David A. Smart (producer); Earl B. Shaw || bw-11m ||  July 23, 1952 || 
|-
|Geography of the United States || Earl B. Shaw || c-15m ||  October 29, 1958 || 
|-
|Geography of Your Community || Zoe A. Thralls || c-11m ||  May 12, 1954 || 
|-
|Geometric Forms in Nature ||  || c-12m || 1977 || 
|-
|Geometry and You || David A. Smart (producer); Harold P. Fawcett || bw-11m ||  September 24, 1948 || 
|-
|Geometry: Inductive and Deductive Reasoning || Carl B. Boyer || c-13m ||  December 3, 1962  || 
|-
|George Washington's Little History of the United States || Ron & Sydney Crawford || c-10m || 1980 || 
|-
|George's New Suit: Where Clothing Comes From || Janet Catherine Rees || c-11m ||  January 14, 1955 || 
|-
|Germany: Feudal States to Unification || T. Walter Wallbank || c-13m ||  June 10, 1959 || 
|-
|Germs and What They Do ||  || c-8m ||  September 1, 1966  || 
|-
|Germs and Your Body || Warren H. Southworth || c-10m ||  August 14, 1974 || 
|-
|Get That Job!: Changing Jobs || Milton E. Larson & Robert T. Boddy || c-11m ||  July 7, 1975 || 
|-
|Get That Job!: Choosing a Career || Milton E. Larson & Robert T. Boddy || c-11m ||  August 3, 1975 || 
|-
|Get That Job!: Finding Leads || Milton E. Larson & Robert T. Boddy || c-11m ||  May 22, 1975 || 
|-
|Get That Job!: Handling the Interview || Milton E. Larson & Robert T. Boddy || c-11m ||  June 6, 1975 || 
|-
|Get That Job!: Keeping Up with the Changing World || Milton E. Larson & Robert T. Boddy || c-11m ||  July 28, 1975 || 
|-
|Get That Job!: Line Up Your Interview || Milton E. Larson & Robert T. Boddy || c-11m ||  June 3, 1975 || 
|-
|Getting Along with Others || Lawrence E. Vredevoe || c-10m ||  October 1, 1965  || 
|-
|Getting the Big Ideas || Theodore L. Harris || c-14m ||  June 26, 1968 || Reading Growth 
|-
|Getting Ideas to Write About || (Centron Corporation); adviser: John R. Searles  || c-10m  ||  1983 || Effective Writing
|-
|Getting Into College || Joe Jefferson || c-13m ||  September 4, 1962  || 
|-
|Getting the Most Out of Your Team || Joel Marks (producer); Kathy Dale McNair ||c-21m|| 1992 || Straight Talk on Teams
|-
|Getting the Order || (Centron Corporation); Joel Marks (producer); Lillian Spina; production manager: Rachel Goodstein || c-17m || 1984 || Telemarketing
|-
|Getting Ready Emotionally || David A. Smart (producer) || bw-10m ||  December 3, 1951 || Are You Ready for the Service?; video
|-
|Getting Ready Morally || David A. Smart (producer) || bw-10m ||  December 3, 1951 || Are You Ready for the Service?; video
|-
|Getting Ready Physically || David A. Smart (producer) || bw-10m ||  December 3, 1951 || Are You Ready for the Service?; video
|-
|Gilberto's Mayan Dream: Guatemala || (Sunrise Films of Toronto); Deepa & Paul Saltzman, Fred Harris (producer); Roger Pyke || c-24m || 1980 ||  World Cultures & Youth (Canada: Spread Your Wings)
|-
|Gilly the Salamander || Leonard Kaplan & Mary Sue Kerner || c-16m ||  September 14, 1976 || 
|-
|Girl of the Navajos || writer: Mary Perrine || c-15m || 1977 ||  Snippet video
|-
|Glaciers  || Charles Shabica & Ron Tyner || bw-10m ||  July 17, 1952, revised 2nd version 1977 || Understanding Our Earth
|-
|Global Concept in Maps || David A. Smart (producer); Erwin Raisz || c-11m ||  August 11, 1947, revised 2nd version 1975 || 
|-
|The Global Energy Game ||  || c-35m || 1978 || 
|-
|Global Forecasting  || Bill Walker (producer)|| c-14m || 1986 || Atmospheric Science
|-
|Global Winds  || Bill Walker (producer)|| c-12m || 1985 || Atmospheric Science
|-
|The Globe and Our Round Earth || Harold D Drummond || c-11m ||  March 24, 1967 ||  
|-
|Globes  || (Christianson Productions);  Joel Marks (producer); David Christianson || c-10m || 1987 || Map Skills for Beginners For Beginners (part animation)
|-
|Goats ||  || c-12m || 1974 || 
|-
|Going Steady? || David A. Smart (producer); Ted Peshak; consultant: Judson T. Landis || c-10m ||  January 5, 1951 ||  Video
|-
|Gold Rush Days ||  || c-14m ||  April 9, 1958 || 
|-
|The Golden Deer ||  || c-11m ||  December 30, 1974  || Part animation
|-
|Golden Rule: A Lesson for Beginners || John Smart (producer); A. M. Johnston || c-10m ||  March 17, 1953 || 
|-
|Goldilocks and the Three Bears || John Smart (producer) || c-11m ||  November 2, 1953 || Video
|-
|Good Eatin''' || || c-15m || 1981 || Healthwise
|-
|Good Eating Habits || David A. Smart (producer); Ted Peshak; consultant: Clifford J. Barborka || c-10m ||  May 22, 1951 ||  Video (BW version)
|-
|Good Eating Habits (2nd edition) || Richard K. Means || c-10m ||  March 15, 1973 || 
|-
|Good Grooming for Girls || Elizabeth S Avery || c-11m ||  January 5, 1956 || 
|-
|Good Sportsmanship (Beginning Responsibility: Being a Good Sport) || David A. Smart (producer); Ted Peshak; consultant: Karl Bookwalter || bw-10m ||  April 7, 1950 || Video
|-
|Good Table Manners || David A. Smart (producer); Ted Peshak || bw-11m ||  May 23, 1951 || Video
|-
|Gopal's Golden Pendant: India || (Sunrise Films of Toronto); Paul Saltzman (producer) || c-24m || 1978 ||  World Cultures & Youth (Canada: Spread Your Wings)
|-
|Grammar: Verbs and How We Use Them || J. N. Hook || c-11m ||  October 3, 1957 || 
|-
|Graphing Linear Equations || Halbert C. Christofferson || c-11m ||  November 9, 1961  || 
|-
|Graphs: Understanding and Using Them || J. Houston Banks || c-11m ||  February 1, 1967  || 
|-
|The Grasshopper: A Typical Insect || Orlando Park & Lawrence I. Gilbert || c-6m ||  February 4, 1955, revised 2nd version 1965 || 
|-
|Gravity || David A. Smart (producer) || c-11m ||  January 30, 1950 || 
|-
|Gravity and What It Does || Nelson F Beeler || c-11m ||  July 15, 1966  || 
|-
|The Great American Student || Bill Walker (producer); Mel Waskin; editor: Bob Gronowski || c-18m || 1978, revised 1985 || 
|-
|The Great Blue Heron || H. Michael Stewart || c-13m ||  November 22, 1976 || 
|-
|The Great Piggybank Raid || Joseph Siracuse || c-12m ||  April 19, 1974 || Forest Town Fable
|-
|The Great Plains || Henry J. Warman || c-14m ||  October 2, 1967 || North American Regions
|-
|Greece: The Land and the People || Norman J.G. Pounds || c-11m ||  March 2, 1959 || 
|-
|Greece: The Land and the People (Update)  || William R Klein || c-11m || 1977 || 
|-
|Greedy Hank's Big Pocket ||  || c-8m ||  July 1, 1970 || 
|-
|Greenland: Stone Age to Jet Age ||  || c-16m ||  July 5, 1972 || 
|-
|Grouping Things in Science || Clifford G McCollum || c-16m ||  September 3, 1969  || 
|-
|Growing and Learning || c-15m || 1983|| Healthwise ||
|-
|Growing Up in the Great Depression  ||   || c-28m || 1987 ||   Snippet video
|-
|Growing Up: Preadolescence || Dale Benner Harris || c-11m ||  July 3, 1958 || 
|-
|Growth in the Desert: Living in the Southwestern States ||  || c-14m ||  August 22, 1971 || 
|-
|Growth of Big Business in America, 1865-1900 || Eric E. Lampard || c-10m ||  October 26, 1967  || 
|-
|Growth of Farming in America, 1865-1900 || Eric E. Lampard || c-14m ||  November 27, 1967  || 
|-
|Growth of Flowers || David A. Smart (producer); John Ott Jr. || c-10m ||  December 27, 1945 || 
|-
|Growth of Flowers (3rd edition)  ||   || c-11m || 1987 || 
|-
|Growth of Flowers: New Edition ||  || c-10m ||  March 12, 1959 || 
|-
|The Gruesome Gray Monster ||  || c-9m || 1976 || 
|}

H

I

J

K

L

M

N

O

P

R

S

T

U

V

W

X, Y

Z

 See also 
 Educational film 
 Social guidance film
 Travel documentary

 References 

 Catalog of Copyright Entries: Third Series Volume 24, Parts 12-13, Number 1: Motion Pictures and Filmstrips 1970 Library of Congress 
 Catalog of Copyright Entries: Third Series Volume 25, Parts 12-13, Number 1: Motion Pictures and Filmstrips 1971 Library of Congress 
 Catalog of Copyright Entries: Third Series Volume 27, Parts 12-13, Number 1: Motion Pictures 1973 Library of Congress 
 Catalog of Copyright Entries: Third Series Volume 28, Parts 12-13, Number 1: Motion Pictures 1974 Library of Congress 
 Catalog of Copyright Entries: Third Series Volume 29, Parts 12-13, Number 1: Motion Pictures 1975 Library of Congress 
 Catalog of Copyright Entries: Third Series Volume 30, Parts 12-13, Number 1: Motion Pictures 1976 Library of Congress 
 Catalog of Copyright Entries: Third Series Volume 31, Parts 12-13, Number 1: Motion Pictures 1977 Library of Congress 
 Catalog of Copyright Entries: Fourth Series Volume 31, Part 4: Motion Pictures & Filmstrips 1980 Library of Congress 
 Educational Film Guide 1947 H. W. Wilson Company 
 Educational Film Guide 1959 Annual Supplement 1959 H. W. Wilson Company 
 Motion Pictures 1912-1939 Catalog of Copyright Entries 1951 Library of Congress 
 Motion Pictures 1940-1949 Catalog of Copyright Entries 1953 Library of Congress 
 Motion Pictures 1950-1959 Catalog of Copyright Entries 1960 Library of Congress 
 Motion Pictures 1960-1969 Catalog of Copyright Entries'' 1971 Library of Congress

External links 
 imdb list of titles
 Coronet Instructional Films on Worldcat

American film studios
Documentary film production companies
Educational films
Non-theatrical film production companies